Arbacia stellata is a species of sea urchin of the family Arbaciidae. Their armour is covered with spines. It is placed in the genus Arbacia and lives in the sea. Arbacia stellata was first scientifically described in 1825 by Blainville.

See also 
 Arbacia lixula
 Arbacia spatuligera
 Arbaciella elegans

References 

Arbacioida
Animals described in 1825